Thymistida nigritincta is a moth in the family Drepanidae. It was described by Warren in 1923. It is found in north-eastern India and northern Myanmar.

References

Moths described in 1923
Drepaninae